Robert Berry (born April 24, 1950) is an American guitarist, bassist, vocalist and record producer, best known for his work with Hush, 3 with Keith Emerson and Carl Palmer, Ambrosia, Alliance, and Los Tres Gusanos.  He was previously with The Greg Kihn Band, and as of 2022, he is with progressive band Six By Six, a super group composed of musicians from Saga, Saxon, and GTR.

History
Berry came into the spotlight in 1988, when he teamed with Keith Emerson and Carl Palmer (of Emerson, Lake & Palmer fame) and formed the band 3. Their only album, To the Power of Three, drew much criticism from progressive rock fans for its radio-friendly and polished 80's sound, considering the progressive pedigree of both Emerson and Palmer.  3 disbanded in 1989 after a successful tour supporting the album. The first single released from the album, Talkin' Bout, penned by Berry, reached No. 9 on the Billboard Mainstream Rock Tracks chart.

Since the dissolution of 3, Berry has participated in several projects, including Tales from Yesterday, a tribute album to Yes. He was also involved in a follow-up to GTR in which he replaced Steve Hackett. Material from this project and an unreleased second 3 album appeared on Berry's solo album Pilgrimage to a Point. Berry's current band Alliance is composed of Gary Pihl from the band Boston on guitar, David Lauser from the Sammy Hagar Band on drums and Alan Fitzgerald from Night Ranger on keyboards.  Berry also has contributed songs to a number of film soundtracks, including the Anthony Michael Hall film Out of Bounds. In 1999, Berry produced and performed on The Wheel of Time, an album billed as a soundtrack to the Robert Jordan fantasy series The Wheel of Time. He is currently (as of 2021) the bassist for The Greg Kihn Band. He also works as a record producer.

In 2015, Berry and Emerson signed with Frontiers Music and began working on a follow-up to To the Power of Three as 3.2. The project was shelved following Emerson's death in March 2016, but Berry would finish the project himself and release it in 2018 under the 3.2 moniker as The Rules Have Changed.

Berry organizes dozens of sessions and tribute albums to bands such as Rush, Pink Floyd, Genesis, and Jethro Tull. He is also the leader of December People, which has produced four albums of Christmas music arranged in the style of various classic rock artists and performs these arrangements around the holidays.

Discography

Solo album
 Back to Back (1985)
 Pilgrimage to a Point (1992)
 In These Eyes (1994)
 Takin' it Back (1995)
 A Soundtrack for the Wheel of Time (1999)
 Prime Cuts (2006)
 The Dividing Line (2008)

Hush
 Hush (1978)
 79 (1979)
 Hot Tonight (1982)
 Hush (1998)

3
 To the Power of Three (1988)
 Live Boston '88 (2015)
 Live – Rockin' The Ritz (2017)

December People
 Sounds like Christmas (2000)
 Rattle and Humbug (2001)
 DP3 (2005)
 Classic Rock Christmas (2009)
 St. Nicks Picks (2017)

Alliance
 Bond of Union (1996)
 Alliance (1997)
 Missing Piece (1999)
 Destination Known (2007)
 Road to Heaven (2009)
 Fire and Grace (2019)

All 41
 The World's Best Hope (2017)

Greg Kihn Band
Rekihndled

3.2
 The Rules Have Changed (2018)
 Third Impression (2021)

External links
 Official website

Living people
American rock singers
American male singer-songwriters
American multi-instrumentalists
American rock bass guitarists
American male bass guitarists
American rock guitarists
American male guitarists
American singer-songwriters
American rock songwriters
American session musicians
Ambrosia (band) members
Sammy Hagar & the Waboritas members
The Greg Kihn Band members
3 (1980s band) members
Magna Carta Records artists
Frontiers Records artists
Geffen Records artists
1950 births